Vlastimir "Vlasta" Velisavljević (28 July 1926 24 March 2021) was a Serbian actor.

Death
Velisavljević died from complications caused by COVID-19 on 24 March 2021, in Belgrade. He was 94. He was buried on 27 March 2021, at the Alley of Distinguished Citizens at the New Cemetery in Belgrade.

References

External links
 

1926 births
2021 deaths
Male actors from Belgrade
Serbian film actors
Serbian stage actors
Serbian television actors

Deaths from the COVID-19 pandemic in Serbia
20th-century Serbian male actors
21st-century Serbian male actors